Messestadion is an indoor sporting arena located in Dornbirn, Austria.  The arena has a capacity of 4,270 people and was built in 1999.  It is currently the home arena of Dornbirner EC who play in the Austrian Hockey League and EC Bregenzerwald of the Alps Hockey League.

In 2014 the stadium was renovated, adding a ColosseoEAS 38 SQM HD LED screen along with a smartphone platform that offers fans connectivity while at the stadium.

External links 
Official website

Indoor ice hockey venues in Austria
Dornbirn
Sports venues in Vorarlberg